Mikita Dzmitryevich Tsmyh (born 15 April 1997) is a Belarusian swimmer. He competed in the men's 100 metre backstroke event at the 2016 Summer Olympics held in Rio de Janeiro, Brazil. He also represented Belarus at the 2020 Summer Olympics held in Tokyo, Japan.

References

External links
 

1997 births
Living people
Belarusian male swimmers
Olympic swimmers of Belarus
Swimmers at the 2015 European Games
European Games medalists in swimming
European Games silver medalists for Belarus
Swimmers at the 2016 Summer Olympics
Swimmers at the 2020 Summer Olympics
People from Mogilev
Male backstroke swimmers
Sportspeople from Mogilev Region